The 2012 Erste Bank Open was a men's tennis tournament played on indoor hard courts. It was the 38th edition of the event known that year as the Erste Bank Open, and part of the ATP World Tour 250 Series of the 2012 ATP World Tour. It was held at the Wiener Stadthalle in Vienna, Austria, from 13 October through 21 October 2012. First-seeded Juan Martín del Potro won the singles title.

Singles main-draw entrants

Seeds

 Seeds are based on the rankings of October 8, 2012

Other entrants
The following players received wildcards into the singles main draw:
  Ernests Gulbis
  Andreas Haider-Maurer 
  Dominic Thiem

The following players received entry from the qualifying draw:
  Ruben Bemelmans
  Daniel Brands
  Vasek Pospisil
  Grega Žemlja

Retirements
  Aljaž Bedene
  Guillermo García López (groin injury)

Doubles main-draw entrants

Seeds

 Rankings are as of October 8, 2012

Other entrants
The following pairs received wildcards into the doubles main draw:
  Martin Fischer /  Philipp Oswald
  Andreas Haider-Maurer /  Maximilian Neuchrist

Finals

Singles

 Juan Martín del Potro defeated  Grega Žemlja, 7–5, 6–3

Doubles

 Andre Begemann /  Martin Emmrich defeated  Julian Knowle /  Filip Polášek, 6–4, 3–6, [10–4]

References

External links
 
 ATP tournament profile

Erste Bank Open
Vienna Open